Free Lutheran Bible College and Seminary (FLBCS) is one institution of higher education consisting of two programs, the two-year undergraduate Free Lutheran Bible College (FLBC) and the four-year pastoral training program Free Lutheran Seminary (FLS). FLBCS is accredited through the Transnational Association of Christian Colleges and Schools (TRACS), a member of the Evangelical Council for Financial Accountability (ECFA), and an associate member of the Association for Biblical Higher Education (ABHE). FLBCS is located in Plymouth, Minnesota, near the national offices of the Association of Free Lutheran Congregations (AFLC).

Bible College
FLBC is a two-year, college accredited undergraduate institution. It was established in 1966 by the AFLC as the Association Free Lutheran Bible School. AFLC church founders sought to establish education for young Christians in the Bible before college, in efforts to help believers to "win, build and equip". Current enrollment is approximately 100 students. FLBC students have attended from outside of the United States including Canada, Latvia, Russia, Czech Republic, Slovakia, Ecuador, Tanzania, Norway, Haiti, Bolivia, Germany, Mexico, and Brazil. The Bible college is a member of the Association of Christian College Athletics (ACCA).

Deans of the bible college
Rev. John Strand (1966–1967)
Rev. Richard Snipstead (1968–1974)
Rev. Ken Moland (1975–1984)
Rev. Donald Greven (1985–1996)
Rev. James L. Johnson (1996–2006)
Rev. Joel Rolf (2006–2018)
Rev. Dr. Wade Mobley (interim) (2018–2019)
Rev. Adam Osier (2019–present)

Seminary
The AFLC established a theological seminary committed to historic Lutheran theology that opened in September 1964. The Free Lutheran Seminary only admits men into the school. Students attend seminary classes for three years. The fourth year is an internship at one of the AFLC churches.

As an institution of the AFLC, the seminary believes and teaches that:

 The Bible is the divinely inspired, revealed, inerrant, and authoritative Word of God and as such is trustworthy in all its parts and is the supreme and only rule of faith and practice.
 The Apostles' Creed, Nicene Creed, Athanasian Creed, the Unaltered Augsburg Confession, and Luther's Small Catechism are faithful expositions of the truths of Scripture.
 The local congregation is the right form of the Kingdom of God on earth. It teaches there is no authority above itself except the Word of God and the Spirit of God.

Deans of the seminary
Dr. Iver B. Olson (1965–1971)
Rev. Amos O. Dyrud (1971–1981)
Dr. Francis W. Monseth (1981–2013)
Rev. Robert L. Lee (acting) (2013–2015)
Rev. Dr. Wade Mobley (2015–2017)
Rev. Dr. James Molstre (2017–present)

Renaming
The office of president over both programs was established in 2015. The school and seminary names were changed on June 14, 2019, to the Free Lutheran Bible College and Seminary. Soon after, FLBCS built the Student Life Center, containing a gymnasium, coffee shop, locker rooms, and classroom and office space.

Presidents 
Rev. Dr. Wade Mobley (2015–present) Office established

Accreditation
The Free Lutheran Bible College and Seminary is a member of the Transnational Association of Christian Colleges and Schools (TRACS), receiving Candidate Status on October 21, 2014. TRACS is a religious-based accreditation organization focusing entirely on accrediting primarily small Christian seminaries. It was fully accredited on October 30, 2018, as a Category Ill institution by the TRACS Accreditation Commission.

See also

 List of colleges and universities in Minnesota
 Higher education in Minnesota

References

External links
FLBC Official Website
Seminary Web page

Lutheran seminaries
Seminaries and theological colleges in Minnesota
Bible colleges
Educational institutions established in 1966
Universities and colleges in Hennepin County, Minnesota
Association of Christian College Athletics member schools
1966 establishments in Minnesota